Steve Bendelack is an English filmmaker and television director who has worked primarily on comedy programmes.

Originally an assistant to Peter Fluck and Roger Law on satirical TV puppet show Spitting Image, Bendelack went on to direct the show in later years. He also directed The Mary Whitehouse Experience, The Royle Family, The League of Gentlemen, Dark Ages, Randall and Hopkirk (Deceased), Cowards and the first series of Little Britain.  He also directed the BBC3 pilot for The Mighty Boosh, in 2003, but was replaced by Paul King for the series proper. He also produced the opening scene for the 1990s edition of Whose Line Is It Anyway? for a short period, but stopped midway through the series. Bendelack has directed the feature films The League of Gentlemen's Apocalypse, Mr. Bean's Holiday and The Harry Hill Movie. Bendelack also directed the first series of Friday Night Dinner and the miniseries Ill Behaviour.

References

External links

Living people
British film directors
British television directors
Year of birth missing (living people)